Mokujiki (木食, "eating of trees/wood") is the Japanese ascetic practice of abstaining from cereals and cooked foods and instead consuming foods from mountain forests. Many adherents primarily rely on flour of buckwheat or wild oats, and supplement their diet with pine bark, chestnuts, torreya nuts, grass roots, and so on. As a mountain diet, it is thought to be imbued with spiritual energy and purity, a marked contrast to a typical worldly diet based on cereals. Some practice it annually for short periods on sacred mountains, while others practice for years at time or even vow to do so for life. Those who make the vow take mokujiki as part of their religious name. It was an essential part of preparation for Buddhist self-mummification.

History 
Mokujiki ("eating wood") implies an active consumption of forest food. A related term, refers merely to abstention from cereals. A practitioner is to abstain from either five or ten cereals, with the precise list varying across instantiations. Abstention from grains was imported from China, where it was common among ascetics in the late second and first centuries BCE; it is still practiced there today as bigu (辟穀).

Recorded evidence of mokujiki in Japan dates from the ninth century, where it is mentioned in the Nihon Montoku Tennō Jitsuroku. Mokujiki has been practiced in various forms throughout Japanese history. It was at its height during the Edo period – between the 1500s through the end of the 1800s – though it is still practiced today. The north east of Japan was the heartland of the practice.

Taoist ideas of the body had a strong influence on the origin of Mokujiki. In Taoist thought, "three worms" (sanchū or sanshi, 三尸, "three corpses") resided in the body, speeding degeneration and death, especially if fed by cereals. So, abstaining from cereals was seen in East Asia, generally, to lengthen life and promote spiritual powers.

The practice has no basis in the Buddhist canon, though it is a part of Japanese Buddhist culture. It is present in a range of Buddhist sects and is particularly prominent in Shugendo and esoteric Buddhist traditions. Kūkai, the founder of the Shingon sect, is said to have abstained from cereals at various points of his life including in his last days; his example has been a significant influence for subsequent mokujiki adherents. It is probable that mokujiki spread from esoteric to Pure Land schools of Buddhism.

Variations 
The requirements of mokujiki practice varied between spiritual communities and with time. In the eighteenth-century Mokujiki Yōa Shōnin Eden, there was a distinction between the "great mokujiki", where one abstains from ten cereals, and the "lesser mokujiki", where the count is five. The precise list of omitted cereals varies across instantiations of the practice. For many adherents, following the "lesser mokujiki" path preceded the "greater".

Some forms of the practice allowed the consumption of buckwheat, a food that fills the role of a durable, easily-digestible, portable staple that does not require cooking. Modern and contemporary practice often involves the consumption of buckwheat paste. While it may seem that consumption of buckwheat is inconsistent with mokujiki practice, adherents who consume it consider it a wild mountain plant, not one of the forbidden cultivated cereals. This view was common by the Edo period. Wild oats and powdered broad beans have filled a similar role.

Many others avoided all cooked foods and also salt, some going even as far as to avoid seaweed.

Adherents

Hijiri 
By the twelfth century, mokujiki was established as one of the practices of wandering ascetics called hijiri. (The hijiri were also known as ubasoku, yamabushi or yūgyōsha.) Impelled by a powerful spiritual experience to undertake penances (of which mokujiki was one), they aimed to achieve ikigami, a state of living divinity, or sokushin-jōbutsu, or being "a Buddha in this very body" (Buddhist mummification). Other practices included the recitation of words of power, cold water austerities, and constant wandering.

Shugendo sect 
Mokujiki was undertaken by some ascetics from the Shugen-do sect of Shingon Buddhism as they fasted unto death for self-mummification. Mokujiki and fasting together reduced their body fat such that their body could be preserved without much extra preparation. Their period of mokujiki observance lasted from one thousand to several thousand days while in seclusion in a special spot reserved exclusively for ascetic practices. The practice was also a part of their training.

Notable adherents 

 Kūkai (空海, 774–835), the founder of the Shingon school of esoteric Buddhism.
Gyōshō (行勝, 1130–1217), a Shingon adherent, "perhaps the best-known medieval mokujiki practitioner".
 Mokujiki Ōgo (木食応其, 1536–1608), an ex-warrior Shingon monk who was a peace broker during the military subjugation of Mt. Kōya by Toyotomi Hideyoshi, and at the Battle of Sekigahara.
 Mokujiki Shonin (木喰上人, 1718–1810), an 18th-century wandering monk known for carving Buddhist statues and leaving them all over Japan. The rediscovery of his artwork had a great effect on the mingei movement of the early 20th century.

References 

Buddhism in Japan
Japanese religious terminology
Buddhist vegetarianism
Asceticism